The Timothy Paine House, also known as The Oaks, is a historic house at 140 Lincoln Street in Worcester, Massachusetts.  Built in the mid-1770s, it is one of the city's oldest buildings, and a good example of Georgian and Federal styling.  It was built by Timothy Paine, a note local judge who fled during the American Revolution due to his Loyalist leanings.    The house has been owned by the Colonel Timothy Bigelow Chapter of the Daughters of the American Revolution,  since 1914 and uses it as a chapter house.  It is open by for tours from May- October or by appointment.  The house was listed on the National Register of Historic Places in 1976.

Description and history
The Timothy Paine House is located in northeastern Worcester, set on a  lot between Lincoln and Paine Streets in the Brittan Square area.  It is set back from Lincoln Street, which was historically the main road between Worcester and Boston.  It is a -story wood-frame structure, with a gabled roof and clapboarded exterior.  The house's main entrance was originally on its south facade, but a new main entrance was placed on the east (Lincoln Street) facade some time after its construction.

Timothy Paine acquired  of land in this part of Worcester in 1767, and began developing it as a country estate in 1774.  His Loyalist leanings were noted early in the American Revolution, and he was forced by a mob to resign his post as mandamus councilor to the governor.  He eventually fled to Halifax, Nova Scotia; his son returned after American independence and recovered the property.  The house was significantly enlarged and given Federal styling during his ownership.  It passed through three more generations of Paines until 1914, when it was purchased by the local DAR chapter.

See also
National Register of Historic Places listings in eastern Worcester, Massachusetts

References

External links
Massachusetts DAR - The Oaks

Houses completed in 1774
Houses in Worcester, Massachusetts
National Register of Historic Places in Worcester, Massachusetts
Houses on the National Register of Historic Places in Worcester County, Massachusetts
Daughters of the American Revolution